Stylez G. White (born Gregory Alphonso White Jr. on July 25, 1979) is a former American football defensive end. He was drafted by the Houston Texans in the seventh round of the 2002 NFL Draft. He played college football at Minnesota.

White was also a member of the Minnesota Vikings, Atlanta Falcons, Tennessee Titans, New Orleans Saints, Washington Redskins, Chicago Bears, Tampa Bay Buccaneers, and Orlando Predators.

College career
White left New Jersey to attend the University of Minnesota. White played for the Gophers from 1998-2001; recording 132 total tackles and 11 quarterback sacks. He led the team with eight tackles-for- loss, five quarterback sacks and five forced fumbles his senior year and earned honorable mention All-Big Ten by both the coaches and media. White played defensive end and line backer which is what he was known for in college. White was drafted in the seventh round of the 2002 NFL Draft by the Houston Texans.

Professional career

Orlando Predators
In January 2006, White signed a contract to play for the Orlando Predators of the Arena Football League.  In his 2-year stint in Orlando, White compiled 17 sacks, including an AFL-record 15 in 2007.  He was named the ADT Defensive Player of the Year in 2007.

Second stint with Buccaneers

2007
After the Predators were eliminated from the 2007 playoffs, Head Coach Jay Gruden (the younger brother of Tampa Bay Buccaneers Head Coach Jon Gruden) recommended White to the Buccaneers head coach, who promptly invited him to training camp with the team.

White was further enticed back to Tampa by Defensive Coordinator Monte Kiffin, who promised him a real shot at making the roster instead of simply being another (training) "camp body". After making the cut at training camp, White was instantly thrust into the limelight on the Buccaneers defensive line. The release of veteran Pro Bowl end Simeon Rice shortly before the start of the pre-season, injuries to free agent acquisition Patrick Chukwurah and the fact that top five 2007 NFL Draft pick Gaines Adams was deemed not ready led to White seeing extended playing time on the field.

In the game against the Atlanta Falcons in November 2007 White turned in a career performance. Starting opposite fellow rookie Adams, he sacked Falcons QB Byron Leftwich twice and forced two fumbles, one of which was returned for a touchdown by Ronde Barber. The Bucs won the game 31-7 to take a 2-game lead at the top of the NFC South. After the game, Coach Jon Gruden was quoted as saying:

Every time he makes a play, I can hear my brother up in the press box saying: 'I told you so.' But he's a good kid, a good guy, a hard worker, and he does have natural pass-rush ability. He's raw a little bit in terms of the big picture, but I give a lot of credit to Greg White. We got him late in training camp, and he's made a real impression on all of us.

White ended the 2007 season, his first with the Buccaneers, leading the team with 8 sacks despite starting only 2 games. 

He also led the team that year with 7 forced fumbles, tied with Broderick Thomas for the most in franchise history in a single year

2008
An exclusive-rights free agent in the 2008 offseason, White signed his one-year, $370,000 tender offer on July 26. White later signed a new three-year, $2.845 million contract on September 15, 2008, with the possibility to earn more money in incentives. White was set to become a free agent in 2011.

White finished the 2008 season with 5 sacks, tied for second most on the team.

2009
For the 2009 season, White again led the Buccaneers in sacks with 6.5. Through Week 8, his first stint as a starting player, he also led the team with 28 quarterback pressures.

2010
In 2010, his last with the Buccaneers, White recorded 4.5 sacks, leading the team for the third time in his four years in Tampa. He also finished the year tied for most forced fumbles on the team with 2

Minnesota Vikings
On August 22, 2011, White signed with the Minnesota Vikings. He was released on September 2, 2011.

Virginia Destroyers
White was signed by the Virginia Destroyers of the United Football League on October 12, 2011.

Personal life
On December 15, 2008, it was revealed that the Hillsborough County Circuit Court had approved White's request to legally change his name from Gregory Alphonso White Jr. to Stylez G. White. According to White, the inspiration for the change came from a character in the 1985 Michael J. Fox film Teen Wolf.

FanSided ranked White as the 10th best pass rusher in Buccaneers franchise history. The Official Buccaneers website ranks White as the best player in franchise history to wear the number 91

White's seven forced fumbles in 2007 are tied for most in a single season in Buccaneers franchise history (Broderick Thomas 1991), and as of 2022 are the most in the past 30 seasons. 

At the start of the 2022 NFL season, White began writing a weekly column covering the Buccaneers for the St. Pete Catalyst.

References

External links
 Orlando Predators bio
 Tampa Bay Buccaneers bio

1979 births
Living people
Malcolm X Shabazz High School alumni
Players of American football from Newark, New Jersey
American football defensive ends
American football linebackers
Minnesota Golden Gophers football players
Houston Texans players
Tampa Bay Buccaneers players
Atlanta Falcons players
Tennessee Titans players
New Orleans Saints players
Washington Redskins players
Chicago Bears players
Cologne Centurions (NFL Europe) players
Orlando Predators players
Minnesota Vikings players
Virginia Destroyers players